Rokometni klub Maribor Branik, commonly referred to as RK Maribor Branik or simply Branik, is a handball club from Maribor, Slovenia. As of the 2022–23 season, it competes in the Slovenian First League. Branik play their home games at Tabor Hall, a 3,261 capacity multi-purpose sports venue in Maribor. Between 2004 and 2010, the team was known as RK Klima Petek Maribor due to sponsorship reasons. Their biggest success is reaching the final of the Slovenian Handball Cup twice and reaching the quarter-finals of the EHF Cup in the 2012–13 season.

History

Handball in Maribor

The first handball team in Maribor was formed in 1925, when the women's selection of the 1. SSK MB played their first Czech handball match at the Ljudski vrt area. The first men's handball team, named Polet, was formed in 1949. They renamed as Branik in 1951, when they participated in the Yugoslav First League qualifiers. In 1954, Branik won their first Slovenian Republic League title, and were promoted to the Yugoslav First League. Between 1955 and 1968, Branik did not achieve any major success and were even relegated to the local Styrian League in 1966, but returned to the top Slovenian division two years later. They were relegated again in 1972, but once again returned in 1979 after spending a few years in the local regional leagues. In 1977, the team merged with Kovinar Tezno to form Maribor. The team was struggling in the next decade and did not achieve any major results. After Slovenia's independence in 1991, the team was reformed with a help from some former handball players, including Marko Šibila, and reached the Third National Handball League (3. DRL).

Maribor Branik
In 2003, a new club called Maribor Branik was founded. In their first season, the team was promoted to the 2. DRL East. In 2005–06, they were promoted to the 1. B DRL, where they stayed until the 2008–09 season, when the team was promoted to the top tier Slovenian First League of Handball. In the same year, they also finished third in the Slovenian Handball Cup. In their first season in the top division, they finished eighth and were runners-up of the Slovenian Handball Cup, where they lost to Celje in the final. As runners-up, they gained a place in the 2010–11 EHF Cup Winners' Cup. They reached the quarter-finals, where they lost to the Spanish side San Antonio. In the same season, Branik finished fifth in the league. They again finished fifth in the 2011–12 season, and were eliminated in the quarter-finals of the 2011–12 EHF Challenge Cup by Maccabi Tel Aviv from Israel. The most successful international season for the club was in 2012–13, when they reached the group stages of the EHF Cup, defeating Dudelange, Kópavogs and Siscia in the qualifications. They were drawn in the group with Danish team Tvis Holstebro, Norwegian Elverum and Polish Wisła Płock. With seven points out of six games, Maribor Branik qualified to the quarter-finals of the competition, where they were eliminated by Göppingen with 57–56 on aggregate. In 2013–14 and 2014–15, the club finished third in the Slovenian League, which is their best result since the establishment. The club was about to enter the regional SEHA League alongside Celje and Gorenje in the 2014–15 season, but all three Slovenian clubs refused entry due to unacceptable financial requirements. In the 2016–17 season, Maribor Branik reached the final of the Slovenian Cup for the second time in their history, where they lost to Celje 36–28.

Arena
Maribor Branik play their home matches at a 3,261 capacity Tabor Hall in the Tabor District of Maribor. The reserve venue of the club is Lukna Sports Hall, a 2,100 capacity all-seater indoor hall, also located in Maribor.

Supporters and rivalries
Kristijan Petek, the former president of the club, was the first to organize a fan group which would support the team at home matches. As he was also the owner of the air conditioning company Klima Petek, which was the main sponsor of the club, the fan group was composed of employees of the company. In 2010, when Andrej Bauman has been appointed a new director of Maribor Branik, the club gained a new group of fans, named Maribor Supporters, which supposedly consisted of the younger members of Viole Maribor, the supporters of football club NK Maribor.

In February 2012, Maribor Supporters chanted a song about the Srebrenica massacre against the Bosnian team Gradačac during the 2011–12 EHF Challenge Cup match. The match was temporarily suspended, and the incident received wide coverage in the Slovenian and Bosnian media. The group was banned by Maribor Branik from attending any home matches, and a police investigation was ordered.

Maribor Branik do not have any major rivals; however, matches between Maribor Branik and RK Celje are dubbed as the Styrian derby, named after Styria, with Maribor and Celje being the two largest cities in the region. Matches between Maribor Branik and RK Jeruzalem Ormož are also called Styrian derby or Neighbourhood derby.

Colours, kits and crest
Initially, the club colours were white and black, which are also the colours of the Branik Sports Association. Before the start of the 2011–12 season, Maribor Branik changed its base colour to purple due to the popularity of NK Maribor, the most successful football club in Slovenia, which plays in purple jerseys. A decade later, before the start of the 2021–22 season, the club returned to its original colours, white for home and black for away games. The club crest is in the form of a shield with an abstract portrayal of a handball player. In 2012, the colours of the crest were changed from black and white to purple and white.

Team

Current squad
Squad for the 2021–22 season

Goalkeepers
 1  Miloš Milačić
 61  Gregor Lorger
 99  Denis Strašek

Right wingers
 8  Matic Dosedla
 13  Tadej Sok
 71  Ignjat Nešić

Left wingers
 11  Žiga Zupanič
 31  Simon Razgor
 77  Filip Rakita

Line players
 21  Leon Gregorič
 23  Anže Blagotinšek

Left backs
 5  Domen Knez
 17  Filip Jerenec
 30  Izidor Budja

Central backs
 9  Aleksa Veselinović
 14  Jan Kovačec
 18  Mitja Janc
 33  Jure Hedl

Right backs
 7  Nejc Planinšek
 20  Matic Košec

Staff

 Head coach: Luka Žvižej
 Assistant coach: Vasja Kozelj
 Physiotherapist: Jan Žnider

Season-by-season records

Maribor Branik in European handball
The table includes matches from the official European Handball Federation competitions only. All results (home and away) list Branik's goal tally first.

Competitions
QR2 = Second qualification round
QR3 = Third qualification round
R1 = First round
R2 = Second round
R3 = Third round
L16 = Last 16
QF = Quarter-final
G = Group stage

Matches
Pld  = Number of matches played
W = Matches won
D = Matches drawn
L = Matches lost
Win% = Winning percentage

By competition
Updated 24 November 2019

Honours
League
Slovenian Championship
Third place: 2013–14, 2014–15

Slovenian Second Division
Runners-up: 2008–09

Slovenian Third Division
Runners-up: 2005–06

Cup
Slovenian Cup
Runners-up: 2009–10, 2016–17
Semi-finalist: 2008–09, 2011–12

Slovenian Supercup
Runners-up: 2010, 2017

International players
The following Maribor Branik players have made at least one appearance for their senior national team.

Bosnia and Herzegovina
Duško Čelica
Dejan Malinović
Marko Tarabochia

Croatia
Goran Bogunović
Zvonimir Kapular
Marino Marić
Ivan Pešić
Mario Šoštarič
Nikola Špelić

Estonia
Andris Celminš

Macedonia
Renato Vugrinec

Montenegro
Mile Mijušković

Serbia
Milan Mirković

Slovenia

Darko Cingesar
Dragan Gajić
Urh Kastelic
Tilen Kodrin
Gregor Lorger
Borut Mačkovšek
Niko Medved
Matjaž Mlakar
Žiga Mlakar
Marko Oštir
Simon Razgor
Aljoša Štefanič
Matic Verdinek
Jure Vran
Igor Žabič
Miha Zarabec
Dani Zugan
Luka Žvižej

Notes

References

External links
Official website 
EHF profile

Handball clubs established in 2003
Slovenian handball clubs
Sport in Maribor
2003 establishments in Slovenia